New Era ("Asre Jadid") is an Iranian  talent television competition. The program was produced by Ehsan Alikhani and launched on IRIB TV3 on 16 February 2019. The second season of the program began on 25 February 2020. And the third season of this contest started on 21 March  2022 , coinciding with Nowruz, and is still being broadcast. New Era is one of the most popular programs in IRIB.

Participants can participate in the arts, sports and entertainments. New Era program attracts a variety of talents from all over Iran to somehow showcase their talent to the public. In this program, participants can individually or in groups in various fields of art, science, sports and entertainment, including singing, magic, acrobatics, comedy, mind reading, math, beatboxing, gymnastics, dubbing and dubbing, martial arts, drama, parkour,  Rhythmic movements and… participate.  This program attracts different abilities from all over Iran. [3] Each participant tries to impress the present judges by showing his talent live and get a white or yes vote from them.  The judges of the program in the first and second seasons were Amin Hayaei, Seyed Bashir Hosseini, Arya Azimi-Nejad and Roya Nonhali.  The program is prepared and performed by Ehsan Alikhani, and in the third season, Amin Hayaee, along with Majid Ismaili, Karen Homayounfar, and Jaleh Sameti, are the judges of the third season of "Asr Jadid".  As in previous seasons, Ehsan Alikhani is in charge of preparing and executing the program. - those who draw their talents and people's votes to the finals and win prizes to compete with other talents.

Awards

Judges and hosts 

The first season of New Era program featured four judges. The judges are Amin Hayai, Bashir Hosseini, Arya Aziminejad and Roya Nonahali. Ehsan Alikhani is also host of the program. The second season of the New Era, as with the first season, was judged by Amin Hayai, Bashir Hosseini, Arya Aziminejad and Roya Nonahali but its third season hold by new judges Zhaleh Sameti, Karen Homayounfar, Majid Esmaeili and also Amin Hayai who was presented in previous seasons.

Season synopses

References

External links 
 

Iranian television shows
2010s Iranian television series
2020s Iranian television series
Islamic Republic of Iran Broadcasting original programming
2019 Iranian television series debuts
Persian-language television shows
Game shows
Talent shows